Christopher Wade (born September 30, 1987) is an American professional mixed martial artist. Wade currently competes in the Featherweight division of the Professional Fighters League (PFL). A professional competitor since 2011, Wade has also competed in the UFC.

Background
Wade was born on September 30, 1987, in Rockville Centre, New York. A talented wrestler, Wade attended Islip High School, where he was a state champion (140 lbs.) as well as a two-time Suffolk County finalist and a Suffolk County Champion. Wade continued his career at the collegiate level where he was a NJCAA National finalist for Nassau Community College and had an NCAA Division III fifth-place finish for SUNY Oneonta. Wade also competed in amateur kickboxing, where was undefeated and held a title.

Mixed martial arts career

Early career
Wade had an amateur MMA record of 2-0 before turning professional in 2011. Wade then compiled a professional record of 5-0 and won the Ring of Combat Lightweight Championship before being signed by the World Series of Fighting.

World Series of Fighting
Wade made his WSOF debut at WSOF 2 on March 23, 2013 against Russian prospect Azamat Dugulubgov. Wade lost the fight via unanimous decision.

Independent promotions
Wade returned to the local circuit and won both of his next two fights before being signed by the UFC.

Ultimate Fighting Championship
Wade made his promotional debut against Cain Carrizosa on August 30, 2014 at UFC 177. Wade won the fight via technical submission from a guillotine choke in the first round.

Wade faced Zhang Lipeng on January 18, 2015 at UFC Fight Night 59. Wade won the fight via unanimous decision.

Wade faced Christos Giagos on June 6, 2015 at UFC Fight Night 68. He won the fight by unanimous decision.

Wade was expected to face Olivier Aubin-Mercier on August 23, 2015 at UFC Fight Night 74. However, Wade pulled out of the fight in late July, after sustaining an injury, and he was replaced by Tony Sims.

Wade was expected to face Mairbek Taisumov on January 17, 2016 at UFC Fight Night 81, replacing an injured Beneil Dariush. Subsequently, Taisumov was pulled from the fight during the week leading to the event due to alleged visa issues, and he was replaced by promotional newcomer Mehdi Baghdad. Wade won the fight via submission in the first round.

Wade was expected to face Rashid Magomedov on May 8, 2016 at UFC Fight Night 87. However, Magomedov pulled out of the fight in early March, and he  was replaced by Rustam Khabilov. Wade lost the fight via unanimous decision.

Wade next faced Islam Makhachev on September 17, 2016 at UFC Fight Night 94. He lost the fight via unanimous decision.

Wade faced Frankie Perez in a rematch on July 22, 2017 at UFC on Fox 25. He won the fight by unanimous decision with the score board of (29-28, 29-28, 30-27).

Professional Fighters League
Wade subsequently parted ways with UFC following the bout and signed a contract with PFL in early 2018.

PFL inaugural season
Wade made his promotional debut against Natan Schulte at PFL 2 on June 21, 2018. Wade lost the fight via unanimous decision.

Wade then faced Yuki Kawana at PFL 5 on August 2, 2018. He won the fight via first-round guillotine choke submission.

Wade advanced to the playoffs and faced Robert Watley in the opening round on October 13, 2018. Wade won the fight via majority decision and advanced to the semifinals.

In the semifinals, Wade faced Natan Schulte again in a split decision losing effort and was eliminated from the tournament.

PFL Season 2019
In early 2019,  it was announced that Wade will be participating in the PFL season 2019 lightweight tournament.

Wade's first appearance of the season took place against Nate Andrews at PFL 2 on May 23, 2019. He won the fight via unanimous decision.

Wade then faced Akhmet Aliev at PFL 5 on July 25, 2019. He won the fight via unanimous decision.

With two wins in the regular season, Wade advanced to the playoffs where he faced Nate Andrews in a rematch at PFL 8 on October 17, 2019. He won the fight via majority decision and advanced to the semifinals.

In the semifinal on the same day, Wade faced Loik Radzhabov and lost via unanimous decision and was eliminated from the tournament.

PFL Season 2021
Wade returned to PFL for the 2021 season, moving down a weight class to featherweight.

Wade faced Anthony Dizy on April 23, 2021 at PFL 1. He won the bout via unanimous decision.

Wade faced Arman Ospanov at PFL 4 on June 10, 2021. He won the bout via knockout after landing a head kick and finishing Ospanov with punches in the second round.

Wade faced Bubba Jenkins in the Semifinals off the Featherweight tournament on August 27, 2021 at PFL 9. He won the bout via unanimous decision.

Wade faced Movlid Khaybulaev in the Finals of the Featherweight tournament on October 27, 2021 at PFL 10. He lost the bout via unanimous decision.

PFL Season 2022 
Wade faced Lance Palmer on April 28, 2022 at PFL 2. He won the bout via unanimous decision.

Wade faced Kyle Bochniak on June 24, 2022 at PFL 5. He won the bout via head kick and then ground and pound TKO in the first round.

Wade faced Brendan Loughnane in the Semifinals off the Featherweight tournament on August 20, 2022 at PFL 9. He lost the bout via unanimous decision.

PFL Season 2023 
Wade will start of the 2023 season in a rematch against Bubba Jenkins on April 1, 2023 at PFL 1.

Mixed martial arts record

|-
|Loss
|align=center|22–8
|Brendan Loughnane
|Decision (unanimous)
|PFL 9
|
|align=center|3
|align=center|5:00
|London, England
|
|-
|Win
|align=center|22–7
|Kyle Bochniak
|TKO (head kick and punches)
|PFL 5
|
|align=center|1
|align=center|1:10
|Atlanta, Georgia, United States
|
|-
|Win
|align=center|21–7
|Lance Palmer
|Decision (unanimous)
|PFL 2
|
|align=center|3
|align=center|5:00
|Arlington, Texas, United States
|
|-
|Loss
|align=center|20–7
|Movlid Khaybulaev
|Decision (unanimous)
|PFL 10 
|
|align=center|5
|align=center|5:00
|Hollywood, Florida, United States
|
|-
|Win
|align=center|20–6
|Bubba Jenkins
|Decision (unanimous)
|PFL 9 
|
|align=center|3
|align=center|5:00
|Hollywood, Florida, United States
|
|-
|Win
|align=center|19–6
|Arman Ospanov
|KO (head kick and punches)
|PFL 4 
|
|align=center|2
|align=center|2:18
|Atlantic City, New Jersey, United States
|
|-
|Win
|align=center|18–6
|Anthony Dizy
|Decision (unanimous)
|PFL 1 
|
|align=center|3
|align=center|5:00
|Atlantic City, New Jersey, United States
|
|-
|Loss
|align=center|17–6
|Loik Radzhabov	
|Decision (unanimous)
|rowspan=2 | PFL 8
|rowspan=2 | 
|align=center| 3
|align=center| 5:00
|rowspan=2 | Las Vegas, Nevada, United States
|
|-
|Win
|align=center| 17–5
|Nate Andrews
|Decision (majority)
|align=center|2
|align=center|5:00
|
|-
|Win
|align=center|16–5
|Akhmet Aliev
|Decision (unanimous)
|PFL 5
|
|align=center|3
|align=center|5:00
|Atlantic City, New Jersey, United States 
|
|-
|Win
|align=center|15–5
|Nate Andrews
|Decision (unanimous)
| PFL 2
| 
| align=center| 3
| align=center| 5:00
|Uniondale, New York, United States
|
|-
|Loss
|align=center|14–5
|Natan Schulte
|Decision (split)
| rowspan=2 |PFL 9
| rowspan=2 |
| align=center| 3
| align=center| 5:00
| rowspan=2 |Long Beach, California, United States
|
|-
|Win
|align=center|14–4
|Robert Watley		
|Decision (majority)
| align=center| 2
| align=center| 5:00
|
|-
|Win
|align=center|13–4
|Yuki Kawana
|Submission (guillotine choke)
|PFL 5
|
|align=center|1
|align=center|4:24
|Uniondale, New York, United States
|
|-
|Loss
|align=center|12–4
|Natan Schulte
|Decision (unanimous)
|PFL 2
|
|align=center| 3
|align=center| 5:00
|Chicago, Illinois, United States
| 
|-
|Win 
|align=center|12–3
|Frankie Perez
|Decision (unanimous)
|UFC on Fox: Weidman vs. Gastelum 
|
|align=center|3
|align=center|5:00
|Uniondale, New York, United States
|
|-
|Loss
|align=center|11–3
|Islam Makhachev
|Decision (unanimous)
|UFC Fight Night: Poirier vs. Johnson
|
|align=center|3
|align=center|5:00
|Hidalgo, Texas, United States
|
|-
|Loss
|align=center|11–2
|Rustam Khabilov
|Decision (unanimous)
|UFC Fight Night: Overeem vs. Arlovski
|
|align=center|3
|align=center|5:00
|Rotterdam, Netherlands
|
|-
|Win 
|align=center|11–1
|Mehdi Baghdad
|Submission (rear-naked choke)
|UFC Fight Night: Dillashaw vs. Cruz
|
|align=center|1
|align=center|4:30
|Boston, Massachusetts, United States
|
|-
|Win 
|align=center| 10–1
|Christos Giagos
| Decision (unanimous)
| UFC Fight Night: Boetsch vs. Henderson
| 
|align=center| 3
|align=center| 5:00
|New Orleans, Louisiana, United States
|
|-
| Win
| align=center| 9–1
| Zhang Lipeng
| Decision (unanimous)
| UFC Fight Night: McGregor vs. Siver
| 
| align=center| 3
| align=center| 5:00
| Boston, Massachusetts, United States
| 
|-
| Win
| align=center| 8–1
| Cain Carrizosa
| Technical Submission (guillotine choke)
| UFC 177
| 
| align=center| 1
| align=center| 1:12
| Sacramento, California, United States
| 
|-
| Win
| align=center| 7–1
| Frankie Perez
| Decision (split)
| Ring of Combat 48
| 
| align=center| 3
| align=center| 5:00
| Atlantic City, New Jersey, United States
|
|-
| Win
| align=center| 6–1
| Pat DeFranco
| Submission (rear-naked choke)
| Ring of Combat 47
| 
| align=center| 2
| align=center| 2:31
| Atlantic City, New Jersey, United States
|
|-
| Loss
| align=center| 5–1
| Azamat Dugulugbov
| Decision (unanimous)
| WSOF 2
| 
| align=center| 3
| align=center| 5:00
| Atlantic City, New Jersey, United States
|
|-
| Win
| align=center| 5–0
| Mike Medrano
| Decision (unanimous)
| Ring of Combat 43
| 
| align=center| 3
| align=center| 4:00
| Atlantic City, New Jersey, United States
| 
|-
| Win
| align=center| 4–0
| Alfred Walker
| Submission (guillotine choke)
| Ring of Combat 42
| 
| align=center| 1
| align=center| 0:59
| Atlantic City, New Jersey, United States
| 
|-
| Win
| align=center| 3–0
| Villi Bello
| Decision (unanimous)
| Ring of Combat 41
| 
| align=center| 3
| align=center| 4:00
| Atlantic City, New Jersey, United States
| 
|-
| Win
| align=center| 2–0
| Maykon Santos
| Decision (unanimous)
| Ring of Combat 40
| 
| align=center| 2
| align=center| 4:00
| Atlantic City, New Jersey, United States
|
|-
| Win
| align=center| 1–0
| Vinicius Agudo
| Decision (unanimous)
| Ring of Combat 38
| 
| align=center| 2
| align=center| 4:00
| Atlantic City, New Jersey, United States
|

See also
 List of current PFL fighters
 List of male mixed martial artists

References

External links 
 Chris Wade at PFL
 
 

1987 births
Living people
American male mixed martial artists
American practitioners of Brazilian jiu-jitsu
Lightweight mixed martial artists
Mixed martial artists utilizing kickboxing
Mixed martial artists utilizing collegiate wrestling
Mixed martial artists utilizing Brazilian jiu-jitsu
Nassau Community College alumni
State University of New York at Oneonta alumni
Ultimate Fighting Championship male fighters
American male kickboxers
American male sport wrestlers
Amateur wrestlers